Ponneri is a state assembly constituency in Tiruvallur district of Tamil Nadu, India. Its State Assembly Constituency number is 2. The seat is reserved for candidates from the Scheduled Castes. It comprises a portion of Ponneri taluk and is a part of Thiruvallur constituency for national elections to the Parliament of India. It is one of the 234 State Legislative Assembly Constituencies in Tamil Nadu, in India. Elections and winners in the constituency are listed below.

Madras State

Tamil Nadu

Election results

2021

2016

2011

2006

2001

1996

1991

1989

1984

1980

1977

1971

1967

1962

1957

1952

References 

 
 

Assembly constituencies of Tamil Nadu
Tiruvallur district